Radu Albot and Dušan Lajović were the defending champions, but Lajović chose not to participate this year. Albot played alongside Illya Marchenko, but lost in the first round to Dominic Inglot and Robert Lindstedt.
Flavio Cipolla and Dudi Sela won the title, defeating Andrés Molteni and Diego Schwartzman in the final, 6–3, 5–7, [10–7].

Seeds

Draw

Draw

References
 Main Draw

Istanbul Open - Doubles
2016 in Istanbul
2016 Doubles